Carla Fröhlich is a Swiss and American nuclear astrophysicist whose research has included the neutrino p-process for nucleosynthesis in supernovae, and the study of multi-messenger astronomy. She is a professor of physics and University Faculty Scholar at North Carolina State University.

Education and career
Fröhlich studied physics and computer science as an undergraduate at the University of Basel, earning a diploma there in 2003. She continued at the University of Basel for a PhD in theoretical physics, completed in 2007. Her dissertation, The Role of Neutrinos in Explosive Nucleosynthesis in Core Collapse Supernova Models with Neutrino Transport, was supervised by Friedrich-Karl Thielemann.

After postdoctoral research as an Enrico Fermi Postdoctoral Fellow at the University of Chicago Department of Astronomy and Astrophysics, the Enrico Fermi Institute, and the Kavli Institute for Cosmological Physics, she joined the North Carolina State University faculty in 2010.

Recognition
Fröhlich is the recipient of the dissertation prize of the Swiss Physical Society (2007) and of the National Science Foundation CAREER Award (2013). In 2022 she was named a Fellow of the American Physical Society (APS), after a nomination from the APS Division of Nuclear Physics, "for seminal contributions to nuclear and neutrino astrophysics, in particular to the understanding of supernovae, their nucleosynthesis, and the neutrino-p process, and for developing predictive models of supernova messengers".

References

External links
Home page

Year of birth missing (living people)
Living people
Swiss astrophysicists
Swiss women physicists
American astrophysicists
American women physicists
University of Basel alumni
North Carolina State University faculty
Fellows of the American Physical Society